United Nations Security Council resolution 1293, adopted unanimously on 31 March 2000, after recalling all previous resolutions on Iraq, including resolutions 986 (1995), 1111 (1997), 1129 (1997), 1143 (1997), 1153 (1998), 1175 (1998), 1210 (1998), 1242 (1999), 1266 (1999), 1275 (1999), 1280 (1999), 1281 (1999) and 1284 (1999) concerning the Oil-for-Food Programme, the Council increased the amount of money that Iraq could use to purchase oil spare parts and equipment to US$600 million.

The Secretary-General Kofi Annan had been calling for the Security Council to raise the limit from US$300 million to US$600 million since late 1999. The resolution, enacted under Chapter VII of the United Nations Charter, also expressed willingness to consider the renewal of the provision and further recommendations of the Secretary-General.

See also
 Foreign relations of Iraq
 Gulf War
 Invasion of Kuwait
 Sanctions against Iraq
 List of United Nations Security Council Resolutions 1201 to 1300 (1998–2000)

References

External links
 
Text of the Resolution at undocs.org

 1293
2000 in Iraq
 1293
March 2000 events